The 2016–17 Indian Women's League season was the first season of the Indian Women's League, a women's football league in India. The season was scheduled to kick off with the preliminary rounds on 17 October 2016 in which the top two teams from the two groups qualified for the league proper. In the final round four teams from qualifier joined by two direct entry teams. Eastern Sporting Union won the title in the inaugural season.

Preliminary round

Teams

Eastern Sporting Union and Rising Student Club entered final rounds by topping their groups, and Alakhpura and Jeppiaar Institute as group runners-up.

Final round

The final round will be held from January 28 to February 14 at the Ambedkar Stadium. The league proper will follow a round robin format with the top four teams advancing to the semifinals.

Group stage

Knock-out Stage

|-
!colspan=4|Semifinals
 
 
|-
!colspan=4|Final

Season awards
The following awards were announced at the end of the season:

 Emerging Player: Jabamani Tudu
 Most Valuable Player: Umapati Devi
 Top Scorer: Kamala Devi

References

External links
 All India Football Federation.

Indian Women's League
2016–17 in Indian football leagues
2016–17 domestic women's association football leagues
Ind